Way Up High is a children's book by American writer Roger Zelazny.  It is one of two stories he wrote for children, the other being Here There Be Dragons, and one of three books without heroic protagonists.  One thousand copies of each of the two books signed by Zelazny were published in 1992 with illustrations by Vaughn Bodē.

Zelazny wrote Here There Be Dragons and Way Up High in 1968-69.  He admired the work of underground comics artist Vaughn Bodē and commissioned him to illustrate the two books.  The drawings were exhibited at the 1969 World Science Fiction Convention in St. Louis, but before the books could be published Bodē informed Zelazny that although Zelazny owned the pictures he did not have the reproduction rights.  Christopher S. Kovacs in his literary biography of Zelazny explains the issue:  “Zelazny saw the book as two of his tales illustrated by Bodē, but Bodē viewed it as a showcase of his art illuminated by Zelazny’s text.”  The publication of the books foundered when Zelazny and Bodē insisted on equal royalties.  Bodē died in 1975 and his estate agreed to the publication of the books with Bodē’s illustrations in 1992. Zelazny dedicated Way Up High to his daughter, Shannon, and Here There Be Dragons to her best friend Lexie Strumor.

Plot synopsis
Susi comes across Herman, a young, lonesome pterodactyl, sunning himself on a rock on her way home from school during the last week of the spring semester.  They become fast friends.  Susi rides on the back of the pterodactyl during the days of summer.  She is astonished by the great height of their flights that makes things on the ground seem so tiny.

Susi asks if pterodactyls are magic.  He replies that he has magic—pterodactyl magic.  Susi asks if she has magic.  Herman says that she has human magic, but she has to learn it for herself.

One day Herman takes Susi for one last flight, the first time at night.  The lights below are as tiny and bright and numerous as the stars above.  She sees beauty in the lights of the city.  Herman says that pterodactyls do not build cities and he can not feel about the cities as she does.  She says she has never felt this way about cities before.  Herman says he thinks she is beginning to find her magic.

When they land Herman explains that the weather is too cold for him, and he must follow the birds south to a warmer climate.  Promising to come the next summer, Herman says good-bye.  That night Susi dreams she finds her magic.

Reception
Carolyn Cushman in  Locus  calls Way Up High “cute” and “interesting.”  She goes on to write that “the story is quite acceptably educational – a little too much so for most adults.”   Darrell Schweitzer in Aboriginal Science Fiction writes that Way Up High and its companion piece, Here There Be Dragons, “are charming, and worthy of widespread circulation.”

Notes

Sources

 Kovacs, Christopher S. The Ides of Octember: A Pictorial Bibliography of Roger Zelazny. Boston: NESFA Press, 2010.

External links

1992 science fiction novels
Novels by Roger Zelazny
Donald M. Grant, Publisher books